Vincenzo Finocchiaro (12 January 1953 – 4 July 2019) was an Italian swimmer. He competed in the men's 1500 metre freestyle at the 1972 Summer Olympics.

References

External links
 

1953 births
2019 deaths
Italian male swimmers
Olympic swimmers of Italy
Swimmers at the 1972 Summer Olympics
People from Avola
Italian male freestyle swimmers
Sportspeople from the Province of Syracuse